Syed Mohammad Saifur Rahman Nizami (born 1916) is a Bangladeshi Islamic scholar and researcher of Hadith. He was awarded Ekushey Padak in 2020 by the Government of Bangladesh.

Birth and early life 
Syed Mohammad Saifur Rahman Nizami was born in 1916 (1323 AH) in the village of North Ichakhali of Ichakhali union in Mirsharai Upazila of Chittagong District. His father, Syed Shah Golam Rahman Echmati. He has been involved in the Quran since he was only 8 years old. He passed Kamel from Govt. Madrasah-e-Alia Dhaka in the 1960. He is the chief advisor of the World Sunni Movement and the World Humanity Revolution.

Children 
Syed Mohammad Saifur Rahman Nizami has three sons and two daughters, his eldest son Syed Imam Hayat who is the founder of World Sunni Movement and World humanity revolution is seen more in public appearance with him and most likely to be his successor.

Career 
Syed Mohammad Saifur Rahman Nizami started his career by teaching at madrasa. He taught as the chief muhaddis at Chittagong Sholashahar Jamia Ahmadia Sunnia Alia Madrasah.
He is the founder of Jameya Rahmania Fazil Madrasa in Mirashoray Chittagong.

References 

1916 births
Living people
20th-century Bengalis
Bangladeshi Sunni Muslim scholars of Islam
Bengali Muslim scholars of Islam
20th-century Muslim theologians
Recipients of the Ekushey Padak
People from Mirsharai Upazila
Bangladeshi centenarians
Men centenarians
Government Madrasah-e-Alia alumni
Bangladeshi people of Arab descent